The Western Naval Command is one of the three command–level formations of the Indian Navy. It is headquartered in Mumbai, Maharashtra. As the senior–most of the three formations, the command is responsible for the all naval forces in the Arabian Sea and western parts of the Indian Ocean and the naval establishments on the west coast of India.

The Command was formed on 1 March 1968. The Command is commanded by a Three Star Flag Officer of the rank of Vice Admiral with the title Flag Officer Commanding-in-Chief Western Command (FOC-in-C). Vice Admiral Dinesh K Tripathi is the current FOC-in-C WNC, who took over on 1 March 2023.

History
After the independence and the partition of India on 15 August 1947, the ships and personnel of the Royal Indian Navy were divided between the Dominion of India and the Dominion of Pakistan. The division of the ships was on the basis of two-thirds of the fleet to India, one third to Pakistan. Two new appointments were created, the  Rear Admiral Commanding Indian Naval Squadron (RACINS), the commander of the surface fleet of the Navy, and the Commodore-in-Charge Bombay, a one-star officer who headed the shore establishments on the western coast. To bring the service more in line with other navies, on 1 May 1952 the Rear Admiral Commanding Indian Naval Squadron was re-designated Flag Officer Commanding (Flotillas), Indian Fleet, 

On 30 December 1957, the office of Flag Officer Commanding (Flotillas) was re-designated Flag Officer Commanding Indian Fleet (FOCIF), while the command of the shore establishments was upgraded to the Two Star appointment of Flag Officer Bombay (FOB) in June 1958. The FOCIF and FOB reported to the Chief of the Naval Staff. On 1 March 1968, the FOB was upgraded to the Three Star of Vice Admiral and was re-designated Flag Officer Commanding-in-Chief Western Naval Command (FOC-in-C WNC). The Indian Fleet was renamed as Western Fleet with the Flag Officer Commanding Western Fleet (FOCWF) reporting into the FOC-in-C WNC.

Area of responsibility
The Western Naval Command (WNC) is the sword arm of the Indian Navy and naval operations conducted on the western seaboard would be central to the outcome of any conflict at sea against Pakistan. The Western Fleet is the two-star level operational formation of the Western Naval Command. It utilises Mumbai and Karwar as its home ports, with INS Kunjali, its HQ in Mumbai.
The fleet at the WNC is based under Flag Officer Maharashtra Area (FOMA) and provides naval defence in the sensitive north Arabian Sea adjacent to Pakistan.
INS Kadamba, a large naval base, was constructed under Project Seabird and completed in 2005. This naval base, at Karwar in Karnataka, is used exclusively by the Indian Navy.

Capabilities 

The Flagship carrier of the Western Fleet is INS Vikramaditya. The WNC is equipped with submarine pens, a carrier dock and main maintenance dockyards. The Carrier Battle Group of the Western Fleet consists of INS Vikramaditya, Delhi class destroyers, Talwar class frigates, Brahmaputra class frigates, INS Kolkata, Indian navy's one of the most powerful destroyer and Sindhughosh class submarines. The Naval Aviation is provided by MiG-29K fighters along with airborne early warning Kamov Ka-31 Helicopters.

Full-fledged shipbuilding facilities on the western seaboard include the Mazagon Dock Limited in Mumbai, the Goa Shipyard Limited and the Cochin Shipyard Ltd in Kerala, which is India's largest repair dry dock.

Organization 
The Western Naval Command is organized as follows:

Naval bases
Naval bases under Western Naval Command are the following

List of Commanders

See also 
 Eastern Naval Command
 Southern Naval Command

References

Indian Navy
Naval units and formations of India
Commands of the Indian Navy